was a Japanese literary critic and member of the Japan Art Academy.

He was born in Tokyo, and graduated from Waseda University in 1953 with a degree in French literature. Between 1979 and 1993 he was a professor at Tokyo University of Agriculture and Technology, and from 1997 at Musashino University.  He died, aged 83, in Tokyo.

Books 
 『内部の人間』（1967, 南北社, のち晶文社）
 『対談・私の文学』（1969, 講談社）
 『無用の告発－存在のための考察』（1969, 河出書房）
 『抽象的な逃走』冬樹社 1970
 『歩行と貝殻』講談社 1970
 『時が流れるお城が見える』（1971, 仮面社）
 『考える兇器』冬樹社 1972
 『小林秀雄と中原中也』　第三文明社(レグルス文庫) 1973
 『作家論』 第三文明社 1973
 『秋山駿批評　1』1973, 小沢書店
 『地下室の手記』（1974, 徳間書店/1991年5月、日本文芸社）
 『秋山駿批評 2』小沢書店 1975
 『言葉の棘 』北洋社 1975
 『文学への問い 秋山駿第一対談集』徳間書店 1975
 『秋山駿文芸時評 1970・6-1973・12 』河出書房新社 1975
 『内的生活』（1976, 講談社）
 『秋山駿批評 3』小沢書店 1976
 『知れざる炎　評伝中原中也』（1977, 河出書房新社/1991年5月, 講談社文芸文庫）
 『架空のレッスン』小沢書店 1977
 『批評のスタイル 』アディン書房 1978
 『内的な理由』構想社 1979
 『文学の目覚める時 秋山駿第二対談集』徳間書店 1979
 『舗石の思想』 講談社 1980 (2002, 講談社文芸文庫)
 『秋山駿批評 4』小沢書店 1981
 『生の磁場 文芸時評1977～1981』小沢書店 1982
 『本の顔本の声』福武書店 1982
 『こころの詭計』（小沢書店 1983）
 『魂と意匠　小林秀雄』（1985, 講談社）
 『簡単な生活者の意見』（1988年, 小沢書店）
 『恋愛の発見』小沢書店 1988
 『人生の検証』（1990, 新潮社　のち新潮文庫/2002年5月, 新潮オンデマンドブックス）
 『時代小説礼讃』（1990, 日本文芸社）
 『歩行者の夢想 秋山駿自選評論集』学芸書林 1991
 『路上の櫂歌』（1994, 小沢書店）
 『信長』新潮社 1996（のち新潮文庫, 1999年）
 『信長発見』共著（1997, 小沢書店　のち朝日文庫）
 『砂粒の私記』(1997年, 講談社）
 『作家と作品私のデッサン集成』(1998, 小沢書店）
 『片耳の話　言葉はこころの杖』(2001, 光芒社）
 『神経と夢想－私の「罪と罰」』(2003, 講談社）
 『信長と日本人　魂の言葉で語れ!』(2004, 飛鳥新社）
 『小説家の誕生　瀬戸内寂聴』(2004, おうふう）
 『批評の透き間』(2005, 鳥影社）
 『私小説という人生』（2006, 新潮社）
 『内部の人間の犯罪 秋山駿評論集』 2007 講談社文芸文庫
 『忠臣蔵』(2008年, 新潮社)
 『「生」の日ばかり』講談社 2011

Awards 
 Gunzō Award for New Writers, literary criticism division (1960）
 Itō-Sei Literary Prize (1990）
 Noma Literary Prize (1996）
 Mainichi Publishing Culture Award (1996）
 Watsuji Tetsurō Culture Award（2003）

References 

 David C. Stahl: The Burdens of Survival: Ōoka Shōhei's Writings on the Pacific War, University of Hawaii Press, 2003, p. 3
 Rebecca L. Copeland (ed.): Woman Critiqued: Translated Essays on Japanese Women's Writing, University of Hawaii Press, 2006, p. 72
 Rebecca L. Copeland, Melek Ortabasi (eds.): The Modern Murasaki: Writing by Women of Meiji Japan, Columbia University Press, 2006, p. 22
 Scott J. Miller: Historical Dictionary of Modern Japanese Literature and Theater, Scarecrow Press, 2009, p. 5
 Paul Gordon Schalow, Janet A. Walker (eds.): The Woman's Hand: Gender and Theory in Japanese Women's Writing, Stanford University Press, 1996, p. 81

1930 births
2013 deaths
Deaths from cancer in Japan
Deaths from esophageal cancer
Japanese literary critics
Academic staff of Musashino University
People from Tokyo
Academic staff of Tokyo University of Agriculture and Technology
Waseda University alumni